Thyagaraja Temple is a Shiva temple, located in the town of Thiruvarur in Tamil Nadu, India. Shiva is worshiped as Puttridankondar, and is represented by the lingam. Daily poojas are offered to his idol referred to as Maragatha lingam. The main idol of worship is Lord veedhi Vidangar (processional icon) (Thiyagarajar), depicted as a Somaskanda form .His consort Parvathi is depicted as Kondi. The presiding deity is revered in the 7th century Saiva canonical work, the Tevaram, written in Tamil by saint poets known as the nayanars and classified as Paadal Petra Sthalam.

The temple complex covers 30 acres, and is one of the largest in India. It houses nine gateway towers known as gopurams. The temple has numerous shrines, with those of Veedhi Vidangar (Thiyagarajar) and Alliyankothai (Neelothbalambal) being the most prominent.

The temple has six daily rituals at various times from 5:30 a.m. to 10 p.m., and twelve yearly festivals on its calendar. The temple has the largest chariot in Asia and the annual Chariot festival is celebrated during the month of March.

The present masonry structure was built during the Chola dynasty in the 9th century, while later expansions are attributed to Vijayanagar rulers of the Sangama Dynasty (1336–1485 CE), the Saluva Dynasty and the Tuluva Dynasty (1491–1570 CE). The temple is maintained and administered by the Hindu Religious and Charitable Endowments Department of the Government of Tamil Nadu.

Etymology

The historic name of Thiruvarur was Aaroor (Arur) and it finds mention in the 7th century saiva canonical work, Tevaram. The term Thiru is added to all temple cities that are mostly revered by the verses of Tevaram, which is the case of Arur becoming Thiruvarur. Another name of Thiruvarur is Kamalalayaksetra, meaning the "holy place that is an abode of lotuses"; the town is also referred so due to the presence of the Kamalalayam tank and the temple deity, Kamalambigai. During the British Raj, the town was termed Tiruvalur, Tiruvaloor, and Thiruvalur. As per the district and municipality websites, the district has the spelling "Tiruvarur", while the town has it as "Thiruvarur". As per Hindu legend, the temple is the place where Kamalaambika's penance to marry Thyagaraja remain unfulfilled.

History

According to legend, a Chola king named Muchukunda obtained a boon from Indra (a celestial deity) and wished to receive an image of Thyagaraja Swamy (presiding deity, Shiva in the temple) reposing on the chest of reclining Lord Vishnu.  Indra tried to misguide the king and had six other images made, but the king chose the right image and manifested thiyagaraja in Tiruvarur. The Muchukunda sahasranamam specifically refers to the deity Tyagaraja as Anapaaya Mahipaala, and as Rajaveshadhari (one who plays the role of a king).

The temple is believed to have been initiated with a large complex by the Pallavas during the 7th century. Contemporary history of the temple dates back to the time of the Medieval Cholas. An inscription dated in the 20th regnal year of Rajendra I (1012–1044) beginning with introduction "Tirumanni valara" is found on the north and west walls of the Thyagaraja shrine. It gives a list of gifts including a number of jewels and lamps to the god veedhividankar (Thyagarajar). It records that the temple was built in stone in the regnal years of the king by Anukkiyar Paravai Nangaiyar.Besides the same lady liberally endowed gold for plating and gilding parts of the vimana, the entrance and the four sides of the shrine. Copper was also donated for plating the doors, corbels of the pillars of the mandapa in front of the shrine. This inscription meticulously records the weight of the endowed gold and copper, besides listing the various ornaments gifted to the temple with description each of them.

The temple complex seems to have acted as the cultural model for the big Brahadeeswarar temple at Thanjavur of Rajaraja Chola I, wherein he enshrined a vitankar which shared with the Adavallan of Chidambaram the status of state cult.  The last Chola monarch to play an important role in the affairs of the temple was Kulothunga Chola III in the early part of the 13th century A.D. It attracted saivas of all schools and was important centre of Golaki matha in the 13th and 14th century.  It was also an important Jaina dwelling place, which was attacked by saivas, as is evident from Periya Puranam, account of life of Dandiyadigal Nayanar.

Architecture

The temple has nine gopurams, 80 vimanas, twelve temple walls, 13 halls, fifteen large temple water bodies, three gardens, and three large precincts. The two main shrines of the temple are for Vanmikinathar (Shiva) and Thyagarajar. Of the two, the former is the most ancient, and derives its name from tha anthill (putru), which takes the place of linga in the main shrine. Appar, the 7th-century poet saint, refers to the main deity in his hymn as puttritrukondan (one who resides in the ant hill). The Stala vriksham (temple tree) is red patiri (trumpet flower tree). The principles and practises of tree-worship and ophilotary are ancient bases whereupon a later date linga worship seems to have been established.

As per folk legend, Thiruvarur is mentioned as the capital town of a legendary Chola king, Manu Needhi Cholan, who killed his own son to provide justice to a cow. The temple has a sculptural representation of a stone chariot, Manuneethi Chozan, the cow and the kid under the chariot in Vittavasal, against the northeast direction of the gopuram.

Here all the nine Navagrahas (planetary deities) are located towards south in straight line also located in northwest corner of 1st (prakaram). It is believed that all the planetary deities got relieved off their curse and hence worshiped Thyagaraja. This temple hold the record of having maximum number of shrines (called sannithis in Tamil) in India. The foot of Thyagaraja is shown twice a year and on other occasions it is covered with flowers. The right leg of the deity and left leg of the goddess named Kondi is displayed during "panguniuthram" festival and "thiruvathirai" (left leg of Thiyagaraja moorthy is never shown). Some of the major shrines in the temple are of Aananthiswarar, Neelothmbal, Asaleswarar, Adageswarar, Varuneswarar, Annamalieswarar and Kamalambal. The unique feature of the temple is the standing Nandi facing the presiding deity.

The temple has a lot of halls, with six of them being the most prominent. Bhaktha Katchi hall is located to the left of the image of Moosukuntha Nandi. The festival image of Thyagaraja arrives at this hall after the Panguni Uthiram festival. Oonjal hall is located opposite to the baktha Katchi hall. The festival images of Chandrasekarar and darunendhu Sekari Amman arrive at this hall during the Thiruvadhirai festival.  
Rajanarayana hall is a public hall for localities of Thiruvaru.  Panguni uthira hall is located in the western part of the temple ,which is also known as sababathi hall, houses the museum of the temple. Similar architecture of halls (Mandapas) simulating a chariot drawn by elephant or horses is found in Sarangapani temple at Kumbakonam, Mela Kadambur Amirthakadeswarar Temple, Sikharagiriswara Temple, Kudumiyamalai, Nageswaraswamy Temple, Kumbakonam and Vriddhagiriswarar Temple, Vriddhachalam.

Chariot festival

Kulothunga Chola II (1133–50 CE) enlarged the temple ritual to have fifty six festivals, some of which are followed in modern times. The annual chariot festival of the Thygarajaswamy temple is celebrated during April – May, corresponding to the Tamil month of Chitrai. The chariot comes around the four main streets surrounding the temple during the festival. The event is attended by lakhs of people from all over Tamil Nadu. The chariot festival is followed by the "Theppam", meaning float festival. The memorial for Thiruvalluvar, Valluvar Kottam, is inspired from the design of the Thiruvarur chariot.

Processional Dance
The Thyagarajar Temple at Tiruvarur is famous for the ajapa natanam (dance without chanting), that is executed by the deity itself.  According to legend, a Chola king named Mucukunta obtained a boon from Indra and wished to receive an image of Thyagaraja Swamy. reposing on the chest of reclining Lord Vishnu.  Indra tried to misguide the king and had six other images made, but the king chose the right image at Tiruvarur. The other six images were installed in Thirukkuvalai, Nagapattinam, Tirukarayil, Tirukolili, Thirukkuvalai and Tirumaraikadu. All the seven places are villages situated in the river Cauvery delta.  All seven Thyagaraja images are said to dance when taken in procession (it is the bearers of the processional deity who actually dance).  The temples with dance styles are regarded as Saptha Vidangam (seven dance moves) and the related temples are as under:

Worship and religious practises

The temple priests perform the puja (rituals) during festivals and on a daily basis. Like other Shiva temples of Tamil Nadu, the priests belong to the Shaiva community, a Brahmin sub-caste. The temple rituals are performed six times a day; Ushathkalam at 5:30 a.m., Kalasanthi at 8:00 a.m., Uchikalam at 10:00 a.m., Sayarakshai at 6:00 p.m., Irandamkalam at 7:00 p.m. and Ardha Jamam at 8:00 p.m. It is believed that during Sayarakshai all the 33 crore devas (celestial beings) are present to worship Lord Thiyagarajar. Further attending the Sayarakshai at Thiruvarur and then attending the Ardha Jamam pooja at Chidambaram is considered to be highly auspicious and beneficial.

The idol of Thiyagarajar is covered with a piece of cloth and flowers, so that only his and amman's face is visible. His right foot and parvathy's right foot are revealed on Aarudhra Dharshan in the month of Margazhi, while his left foot and amman's left foot are revealed on Panguni Uthiram.

Music, dance and literature

Historically, Thiruvarur has been a centre of eminent people in religion, arts and science. Sundarar, an 8th-century Saivite saint, mentions "I am the slave of all those born in Thiruvarur" in his works in Tevaram. Two of the 63 nayanmars of Saivite tradition namely, Kalarsinga Nayanar and Tandiyadigal Nayanar were born in Thiruvarur. The Periyapuranam, a 12th-century Saiva canonical by Sekkizhar, dedicates a chapter to those born in Thiruvarur, including these two saints. The town was a traditional centre of music and dance – the inscriptions from Rajaraja Chola associate a large body of dancers associated with the temple. Thiruvarur is home to Trinity of Carnatic music, namely Thyagaraja (1767–1847 CE), Muthuswami Dikshitar (1775–1835 CE) and Shyama Shastri (1762–1827 CE). Muthuswami Dikshitar has sung eulogies of the temple deities of the Thyagarajaswami temple. Thyagaraja was named after the deity of this temple. There was large influx of the acumen of South Indian culture to the town during the 17th century CE due to the political unrest in Thanjavur and increased patronage of the Maratha kings to Thiruvarur, resulting in developments in music and dance. A unique musical instrument called panchamuga vadyam with each of its five ends ornamented differently is used in the temple. A type of nadaswaram (pipe instrument) called Barinayanam is also a unique instrument found only in Thiruvarur. Thyagaraja Leelaikal is a work on the playful nature of the deity Thyagaraja of Thiruvarur. It is similar to the Thiruvilaiyadal Puranam in that it identifies Thyagaraja with the Cholas in the same way that the former identifies Meenakshi with the Pandyas. It is dated to the twelfth century CE.

Mahasamprokshanam
The Mahasamprokshanam also known as Kumbhabhishekam of the temple was held on 8 November 2015. The heavy rains blow in Tiruvarur at the time of mahasamprokshanam, the people came in lot.

Notes

References

Bibliography

External links

Shiva temples in Tiruvarur district
Padal Petra Stalam
Dravidian architecture
Chola architecture